Boys like You may refer to:

"Boys like You" (Gail Davies song), 1984
"Boys like You" (360 song), 2011
"Boys Like You" (Who Is Fancy song), featuring Ariana Grande and Meghan Trainor, 2015
"Boys Like You" (Itzy song), 2022
"Boys like You", song by Loretta Lynn from Songs from My Heart, 1965
"Boys like You", song by Brenda K. Starr from I Want Your Love, 1985
"Boys like You", song by Leona Naess from I Tried to Rock You But You Only Roll, 2001
"Boys like You", song by Megan and Liz
"Boys like You", song by Carter's Chord
"Boys Like You", song by VVAVES featuring Iggy Azalea, 2019
"Boys Like You", song by Dodie Clark, 2019
"Boys Like You", song by Anna Clendening